The East Suffolk and Ipswich Hospital was a National Health Service hospital in Anglesea Road, Ipswich, Suffolk, England. The former main building, which is now a private nursing home, is a Grade II listed building.

History
The hospital was founded by public subscription by local residents in 1835. It was designed by John Whitling and opened as the East Suffolk and Ipswich Hospital and Dispensary in August 1836. A children's wing was added in 1875 and it was renamed the East Suffolk and Ipswich Hospital in 1902.

It joined the National Health Service in 1948 and it became the Ipswich Hospital, Anglesea Road Wing in 1955. After services transferred to Ipswich Hospital, Heath Road Wing, it closed in 1985. The main building re-opened as the Anglesea Heights Nursing Home in 1991.

References

Defunct hospitals in England
Hospitals in Suffolk
Grade II listed buildings in Ipswich